Ardassa, known before 1927 as Salpovo (Σούλποβο), is a small town in the Mouriki municipal unit, northern Kozani regional unit, Greece.

Populated places in Kozani (regional unit)